Parataenius simulator is a species of aphodiine dung beetle in the family Scarabaeidae. It is found in Africa, Australia, the Caribbean, Europe, Northern Asia (excluding China), Central America, North America, and South America.

References

Further reading

 

Scarabaeidae
Articles created by Qbugbot
Beetles described in 1868